Stockbury Hill Wood is a   nature reserve near Stockbury, north-east of Maidstone in Kent. It is managed by the Kent Wildlife Trust.

This wood is mainly yew, hornbeam and oak. It has a variety of orchids, such as bird's-nest, lady and fly. There are orange tip and holly blue butterflies.

Access is by prior arrangement with the Trust only.

References

Kent Wildlife Trust